Hautewerk is a rock group based out of Orange County, California, composed of Kenny Howes and John Hall.

History 

Kenny Howes and John Hall first met in the summer of 2000, but it was not until Howes' relocation to Orange County, California in 2003 that the two began to occasionally collaborate on studio recordings.  The two set their sights on film/television scoring, experimenting with ambient and synth pop, but little by little their work found a halfway point between those styles and Howes' prior power pop work.

Along with occasional collaborator Matthew Hill, Howes and Hall began to piece together what would become their debut CD, Stop Start Again, which was released on the independent RIC Media label (a division of Rickenbacker International Corporation) in 2006.  The group celebrated their CD release at the House of Blues in Hollywood, California on August 25 of that year, as part of Rickenbacker's 75th Anniversary Event.  For this performance, the lineup was Howes, Hall, Matthew Hill and Michael Simmons of sparklejets*uk.

The performing version of the group features Howes on guitar and lead vocals, Hall on bass guitar and vocals, Steve Anderson on guitar and vocals, Chris Bradley on keyboards and vocals, and Paul Brown on drums.

In April 2009, Harmonix announced the release of three Hautewerk recordings for their highly successful Rock Band video game. According to a former Harmonix employee, the band's inclusion in the game was part of a licensing deal to include digital recreations of Rickenbacker guitars in The Beatles: Rock Band. John Hall is the CEO of Rickenbacker.

Discography
 Stop Start Again (CD) – RIC Media (2006)

References

External links
 Hautewerk website
 Hautewerk live performances on YouTube

Musical groups from Orange County, California